Siti Networks Ltd, formerly known as Wire and Wireless (India) Limited (WWIL), is a multi system operator (MSO) promoted by the Essel Group (now just 6.1% minority stake holder). The company provides digital cable television services in India and is headquartered in Noida, Uttar Pradesh.

History
WWIL was formed as a part of the de-merger of Zee Entertainment Enterprises Limited – ZEEL, formerly known as Zee Telefilms Limited (ZTL) – the publicly listed flagship company of Zee Group. As per the Scheme of Arrangement approved by the High Court in Mumbai, all the cable TV distribution business within ZEEL and Siti Cable Networks Limited (Siti Cable) was transferred to WWIL as of 31 March 2006. Siti Cable was a 100% subsidiary of Zee Telefilms Limited. The cable operations of Siti Cable were launched in June 1994. SITI Cable was known as Wire and Wireless (India) Limited till 5 September 2012 wherein after it is renamed as SITI Cable Network Limited
it is renamed as SITI NETWORK LIMITED

Fall of promoters' shareholding
In October 2021, it was reported that promoters of Essel Group only had 6.1% stake left in Siti Networks. Ltd.

References

External links
 Official website

Companies based in Noida
Cable television companies of India
Television networks in India
Indian brands
Internet service providers of India
Indian companies established in 1994
1994 establishments in Uttar Pradesh
Mass media companies established in 1994
Companies listed on the National Stock Exchange of India
Companies listed on the Bombay Stock Exchange